National symbols of New Zealand are used to represent what is unique about the nation, reflecting different aspects of its cultural life and history.

Official symbols

Unofficial emblems

Cultural icons
Icons of New Zealand culture are almost as well known by New Zealanders and visitors as unofficial symbols. Certain items of popular culture thought to be unique to New Zealand are also called "Kiwiana".

See also

 Kiwi (people)
 Kiwiana

References

External links
 Nationhood and Identity
 Symbols of Identity